Apogastropoda was previously used as a major taxonomic grouping of sea snails, marine gastropod molluscs. This infraclass mostly consisted of marine limpets and operculate snails. At least 20,000 species were considered to exist within the two clades that were included, Heterobranchia and Caenogastropoda.

Description
Gastropods that were placed in this taxon have bifurcate tentacle nerves and two pedal commissures.

Reasons for establishing 
Older morphological and molecular studies appeared to show that the Caenogastropoda and Heterobranchia should be considered as sister taxa, comprising the Apogastropoda.

This taxon was used in taxonomy of the Gastropoda (Ponder & Lindberg, 1997).

Reasons for rejection 
However this taxonomic grouping is no longer used (according to the taxonomy of the Gastropoda by Bouchet & Rocroi, 2005). It is out-dated because more recent molecular studies have proved that it contains two separate evolutionary lineages, the two clades mentioned above.

Apogastropoda was also rejected according to the nucleotide sequence of mitochondrial genome in 2008.

Synonyms
Anaclodonta
Archaeobranchia
Architectonicoida
Ctenobranchia
Gymnoglossa
Heterophrosynidae
Oligopteria
Orbacea
Peristomacea
Potamophila
Taenioglossa

Taxonomy 
Apogastropoda comprised taxa as follows according to the taxonomy of the Gastropoda (Ponder & Lindberg, 1997):

Superorder Caenogastropoda Cox, 1960

Order Architaenioglossa Haller, 1890
Superfamily Ampullarioidea J.E. Gray, 1824
Superfamily Cyclophoroidea J.E. Gray, 1847 (terrestrial)
Order Sorbeoconcha Ponder & Lindberg, 1997
Suborder Cerithiimorpha Golikov & Starobogatov, 1975
Superfamily Spanionematoidea
Suborder Hypsogastropoda Ponder & Lindberg, 1997
Infraorder Littorinimorpha Golikov & Starobogatov, 1975
Superfamily Calyptraeoidea Lamarck, 1809
Superfamily Capuloidea J. Fleming, 1822
Superfamily Carinarioidea Blainville, 1818
Superfamily Cingulopsoidea Fretter & Patil, 1958
Superfamily Cypraeoidea Rafinesque, 1815 (cowries)
Superfamily Ficoidea Meek, 1864
Superfamily Laubierinoidea Warén & Bouchet, 1990
Superfamily Littorinoidea (Children), 1834 (periwinkles)
Superfamily Naticoidea Forbes, 1838 (moon shells)
Superfamily Rissooidea J.E. Gray, 1847 (Risso shells)
Superfamily Stromboidea Rafinesque, 1815 (true conchs)
Superfamily Tonnoidea Suter, 1913
Superfamily Trivioidea Troschel, 1863
Superfamily Vanikoroidea J.E. Gray, 1840
Superfamily Velutinoidea J.E. Gray, 1840
Superfamily Vermetoidea Rafinesque, 1815 (worm shells)
Superfamily Xenophoroidea Troschel, 1852 (carrier shells)
Infraorder Neogastropoda Thiele, 1929
Superfamily Buccinoidea (whelks, false tritons)
Superfamily Cancellarioidea Forbes & Hanley, 1851
Superfamily Conoidea Rafinesque, 1815
Superfamily Muricoidea Rafinesque, 1815
Infraorder Ptenoglossa J.E. Gray, 1853
Superfamily Eulimoidea Philippi, 1853
Superfamily Janthinoidea Lamarck, 1812
Superfamily Triphoroidea J.E. Gray, 1847
Suborder Discopoda P. Fischer, 1884 - sometimes included in Cerithiimorpha
Superfamily Campaniloidea Douvillé, 1904
Superfamily Cerithioidea Férussac, 1822
Suborder Murchisoniina Cox & Knight, 1960
Superfamily Loxonematoidea Koken, 1889

Superorder Heterobranchia J.E. Gray, 1840

Order Heterostropha P. Fischer, 1885
Superfamily Architectonicoidea J.E. Gray, 1840
Family Architectonicidae Gray, 1850
Superfamily Omalogyroidea G.O. Sars, 1878
Superfamily Pyramidelloidea J.E. Gray, 1840
Superfamily Rissoelloidea J.E. Gray, 1850
Superfamily Valvatoidea J.E. Gray, 1840
Order Opisthobranchia Milne-Edwards, 1848 
Suborder Nudibranchia Blainville, 1814 (nudibranchs)
Infraorder Anthobranchia Férussac, 1819
Superfamily Doridoidea Rafinesque, 1815
Superfamily Doridoxoidea Bergh, 1900
Superfamily Onchidoridoidea Alder & Hancock, 1845
Superfamily Polyceroidea Alder & Hancock, 1845
Infraorder Cladobranchia Willan & Morton, 1984
Superfamily Aeolidioidea J.E. Gray, 1827
Superfamily Arminoidea Rafinesque, 1814
Superfamily Dendronotoidea Allman, 1845
Superfamily Metarminoidea Odhner in Franc, 1968
Suborder Anaspidea P. Fischer, 1883 (sea hares)
Superfamily Akeroidea Pilsbry, 1893
Superfamily Aplysioidea Lamarck, 1809
Suborder Cephalaspidea P. Fischer, 1883
Superfamily Acteonoidea D'Orbigny, 1835
Superfamily Bulloidea Lamarck, 1801
Superfamily Cylindrobulloidea Thiele, 1931
Superfamily Diaphanoidea Odhner, 1914
Superfamily Haminoeoidea Pilsbry, 1895
Superfamily Philinoidea J.E. Gray, 1850
Superfamily Ringiculoidea Philippi, 1853
Suborder Gymnosomata Blainville, 1824 (sea angels)
Suborder Notaspidea P. Fischer, 1883
Superfamily Pleurobranchoidea Férussac, 1822
Superfamily Tylodinoidea J.E. Gray, 1847
Suborder Sacoglossa Von Ihering, 1876
Superfamily Oxynooidea H. & A. Adams, 1854
Suborder Thecosomata Blainville, 1824 (sea butterflies)
Infraorder Euthecosomata
Superfamily Limacinoidea
Superfamily Cavolinioidea
Infraorder Pseudothecosomata
Superfamily Peraclidoidea
Superfamily Cymbulioidea
Order Pulmonata Cuvier in Blainville, 1814 (pulmonates)
Subinfraorder Orthurethra
Superfamily Achatinelloidea Gulick, 1873
Superfamily Cochlicopoidea Pilsbry, 1900
Superfamily Partuloidea Pilsbry, 1900
Superfamily Pupilloidea Turton, 1831
Subinfraorder Sigmurethra
Superfamily Acavoidea Pilsbry, 1895
Superfamily Achatinoidea Swainson, 1840
Superfamily Aillyoidea Baker, 1960
Superfamily Arionoidea J.E. Gray in Turnton, 1840
Superfamily Buliminoidea Clessin, 1879
Superfamily Camaenoidea Pilsbry, 1895
Superfamily Clausilioidea  Mörch, 1864
Superfamily Dyakioidea Gude & Woodward, 1921
Superfamily Gastrodontoidea Tryon, 1866
Superfamily Helicoidea Rafinesque, 1815
Superfamily Helixarionoidea Bourguignat, 1877
Superfamily Limacoidea Rafinesque, 1815
Superfamily Oleacinoidea H. & A. Adams, 1855
Superfamily Orthalicoidea Albers-Martens, 1860
Superfamily Plectopylidoidea Moellendorf, 1900
Superfamily Polygyroidea Pilsbry, 1894
Superfamily Punctoidea Morse, 1864
Superfamily Rhytidoidea Pilsbry, 1893
Superfamily Sagdidoidera Pilsbry, 1895
Superfamily Staffordioidea Thiele, 1931
Superfamily Streptaxoidea J.E. Gray, 1806
Superfamily Strophocheiloidea Thiele, 1926
Superfamily Trigonochlamydoidea Hese, 1882
Superfamily Zonitoidea Mörch, 1864
Infraorder Acteophila Dall, 1885
Superfamily Melampoidea Stimpson, 1851
Infraorder Trimusculiformes Minichev & Starobogatov, 1975
Superfamily Trimusculoidea Zilch, 1959
Infraorder Stylommatophora A. Schmidt, 1856 (land snails)
Suborder Basommatophora Keferstein in Bronn, 1864 (freshwater pulmonates)
Superfamily Acroloxoidea Thiele, 1931
Superfamily Amphiboloidea J.E. Gray, 1840
Superfamily Chilinoidea H. & A. Adams, 1855
Superfamily Glacidorboidea Ponder, 1986
Superfamily Lymnaeoidea Rafinesque, 1815
Superfamily Planorboidea Rafinesque, 1815
Superfamily Siphonarioidea J.E. Gray, 1840
Suborder Eupulmonata Haszprunar & Huber, 1990
Suborder Systellommatophora Pilsbry, 1948
Superfamily Onchidioidea Rafinesque, 1815
Superfamily Otinoidea H. & A. Adams, 1855
Superfamily Rathouisioidea Sarasin, 1889

References

External links

 Apogastropoda taxonomy at NCBI
 Gastropod taxonomy at Palaeos
 Gastropods in captivity
 Gastropod reproductive behavior
 Gastropod Neuroscience
 Reconstructions of fossil gastropods
 2004 Linnean taxonomy of gastropods

Obsolete gastropod taxa
Gastropod taxonomy